Britain's Next Top Model (or Britain & Ireland's Next Top Model 2011–13), often abbreviated as BNTM, BINTM, or Top Model, is a British-Irish reality television show in which a number of women compete for the title of Britain's Next Top Model and a chance to start their career in the modelling industry. The first "cycle" premiered on 14 September 2005 on Sky Living.

The winner normally receives a modelling contract, cosmetics campaign, and a spread within a fashion magazine which also included appearing on the front cover. Other prizes which changed from cycle to cycle included a car, holiday, money, or an apartment among other things.

As part of the Top Model franchise, it was based on the American television series America's Next Top Model. From series 7 thru 9, the show was named Britain and Ireland's Next Top Model as it had begun to include contestants from Ireland.

On 28 October 2013, Sky Living confirmed that the show had been cancelled. In April 2015, the show confirmed via its Twitter account that it would be returning in 2015 on Lifetime. The title was changed back to Britain's Next Top Model due to licensing issues, but contestants from Ireland were still allowed to apply for the show.

Premise

The series features a group of young female contestants who live together in a house for several weeks while taking part in challenges, photo shoots and meetings with members of the modelling industry. Normally, one poor-performing contestant is eliminated each week until the last contestant remaining is declared "Britain's Next Top Model" and receives a modelling contract along with other prizes.

In a BBC interview, Elle Macpherson contrasted the show with the U.S. version, describing BNTM as "Uniquely British, the sense of humour and the styling is very British... more hybrid backgrounds... and I think that is really examplatory [sic] of what's going on in the UK today".

Format

Each series of Britain's Next Top Model features from ten to fourteen episodes and begins with twelve to fourteen contestants. Each episode, one contestant is eliminated, though in rare cases a double elimination or no elimination is given by consensus of the judging panel. Series 6 saw a live finale where the public chose the winner of the cycle. The series was narrated by Fearne Cotton. Due to maternity leave, Cotton did not fulfil this role for the ninth series. She was replaced by Dawn Porter. When the show got revived on Lifetime, Dawn Porter was replaced by Cycle 5 and America's Next Top Model cycle 18 contestant, Annaliese Dayes.

Starting with the ninth series, the elimination process was changed. Multiple contestants were in danger of elimination every week, with the number of contestants in danger being lowered as the competition progressed.

Judges
The series 9 panel consisted of Elle Macpherson, Tyson Beckford, and fashion designer, pop star, model, and former X Factor Judge Dannii Minogue. It was originally reported for series 8 that Grace Woodward would leaving the judging panel to be replaced by Kelly Osbourne and that both Charley Speed and Julien Macdonald would continue on the judging panel. However it was later announced that both Speed and Woodward were leaving the panel to be replaced by Tyson Beckford and Whitney Port. Previous judges have included Lisa Butcher, Marie Helvin, Paula Hamilton, Huggy Ragnarsson, industry expert Jonathan Phang and fashion expert Gerry DeVeaux. Usually, an additional guest judge will sit in on the panel every week.

Requirements 
According to the show's official site, anyone with the right to live or work in Britain is free to apply for the show, but must meet the height requirement of 5'8", and be between the ages of 18-23 at the time they try out for the show. This is true for series 6-8. During the first casting episode of cycle 7, some producers stated that 'The requirements would be stricter' in order to accommodate models closer within the range of the real fashion world.

Exhibition
Britain & Ireland's Next Top Model Live was launched by Media 10 in October 2010 at ExCeL London. The event was created to immerse members of the public into the Britain and Ireland's Next Top Model (BINTM) lifestyle. Bringing the TV series to life, the event gave every visitor the opportunity to experience the Top Model lifestyle for themselves. The show featured 45 minute catwalk shows, music performances from celebrities and an exhibition full of clothes and fashion accessories for the visitor to purchase.
The 2011 Britain and Ireland's Next Top Model Live took place from 28–30 October at London ExCel.

Cycles

America's Next Top Model: British Invasion

In 2012, it was announced that seven past contestants would be appearing on Cycle 18 of America's Next Top Model. Both Cycles 1 and 7 were unrepresented. The returning contestants from Britain's Next Top Model and their placements for Cycle 18 were:

 The contestant was eliminated
 The contestant quit the competition
 The contestant won the competition

This is the first ANTM Cycle to feature a Non-American Winner and where more than one contestant decided to quit during the same season.

Juste Juozapaityte

In 2014, cycle 7 runner-up Juste Juozapaityte participated on Top Model po-russki's (the Russian adaptation of Top Model) fifth cycle, which included contestants from Russia and contestants from other countries with Russian roots. Juozapaityte, from London, was born in Lithuania and is of Russian descent. She finished in second place to Zhenya Nekrasova of Kemerovo.

References

External links
Official site

 
2000s British reality television series
2010s British reality television series
2005 British television series debuts
2017 British television series endings
Sky UK original programming
British television series revived after cancellation
British television series based on American television series